Same-sex marriage in Iceland has been legal since 27 June 2010. A bill providing for a gender-neutral marriage definition was passed by the Althing on 11 June 2010. No members of Parliament voted against the bill, and public opinion polls suggested that the bill was very popular. Iceland became the ninth country in the world to legalize same-sex marriage.

Iceland has become a popular marriage destination for same-sex couples and was listed in the "Top 10 Gay Wedding Destinations" by Lonely Planet in 2014.

Registered partnerships

Registered partnerships for same-sex couples were introduced in Iceland in 1996. The law was adopted by the Althing on 4 June by a vote of 44–1 and entered into force on 27 June 1996. This legislation was repealed with the passing of the gender-neutral marriage law in 2010. The legislation granted the same range of protections, responsibilities and benefits as marriage, and was only applicable to same-sex couples. All parties in the Althing were in favour of the law. Iceland became the fourth country in the world to establish registered partnerships for same-sex couples, following Denmark, Norway and Sweden.

On 8 May 2000, the Icelandic Parliament approved amendments to the registered partnership law in a vote of 49–1. Foreigners could enter into a registered partnership if they had been residing in Iceland for at least two years. Another amendment allowed for a person in a registered partnership to adopt the biological child of his or her partner, unless the child was adopted from a foreign country. Iceland became the second country in the world, after Denmark, to grant same-sex couples some adoption rights. On 2 June 2006, Parliament voted for legislation granting same-sex couples the same rights as heterosexuals in adoption, parenting and assisted insemination treatment. No member of Parliament voted against the proposal and the law came into effect on 27 June 2006. Another amendment to the partnership law which took effect on 27 June 2008 allowed the Church of Iceland and other religious groups to bless same-sex registered partnerships.

Notable Icelandic individuals joined in a registered partnership included former Prime Minister Jóhanna Sigurðardóttir and her partner Jónína Leósdóttir. On 27 June 2010, they had their registered partnership converted into a recognized marriage.

Statistics
The rate of registered partnerships remained relatively constant over the years. According to Statistics Iceland, 12 same-sex couples entered into such partnerships in 2003. This number was 17 in 2004, 13 in 2005, 13 in 2006, 19 in 2007, and 18 in 2008.

Same-sex marriage 
The Government of Iceland, elected in April 2009, announced the introduction of a gender-neutral marriage act at some point in the future. On 19 May 2009, it publicly stated that "a single marriage act will be adopted". Though it was not explicitly stated, it implied that the act would be gender-neutral. The opposition Progressive Party also supports same-sex marriage.

On 18 November 2009, the Minister of Justice and Human Rights, Ragna Árnadóttir, confirmed that the Icelandic Government was working on a "single marriage act" which would include both opposite-sex and same-sex couples. On 23 March 2010, the government presented a bill to repeal the registered partnership law and allow couples to marry regardless of gender. The bill would amend the Marriage Act to define marriage as the union of "two persons", and make all references to marriage and married spouses gender-neutral. On 11 June 2010, the Icelandic Parliament approved the bill 49 to 0, with 7 abstentions and 7 absences. The legislation was signed into law by President Ólafur Ragnar Grímsson on 22 June, and took effect on 27 June 2010. Among the first couples to marry were Prime Minister Sigurðardóttir and her partner Leósdóttir in Reykjavík on 27 June.

Marriages in the Church of Iceland
In October 2015, the Church of Iceland voted to allow same-sex couples to marry in its churches. A freedom of conscience clause which would have allowed priests to decide based on religious or personal grounds whether to perform a ceremony was voted down by the Church Assembly. The Bishop of Iceland, Agnes M. Sigurðardóttir, welcomed the move to perform same-sex marriages, saying "the church is primarily a channel of the love of Christ and celebrates life in all its diversity." Other smaller religious organisations also perform same-sex marriages, including the Ásatrúarfélagið, which has been conducting same-sex weddings since 2003.

Public opinion
A February 2000 Gallup opinion poll showed that 53% of Icelanders supported the right of same-sex couples to adopt children, 12% declared their neutrality and 35% were against the right to adopt.

A June 2004 Gallup poll showed that 87% of Icelanders supported same-sex marriage. Furthermore, a Fréttablaðið opinion survey in November 2005 showed that 82.3% of the population supported access to assisted pregnancy for lesbian couples.

According to a 2006 Gallup poll, 89% of Icelanders supported same-sex marriage, with 11% opposed. Specifically, 66% supported both civil and religious same-sex marriages, 19% supported only civil marriages and 3% only religious marriages. Support varied by age: 92% of 18–24-year-olds were in favour of same-sex marriage, compared to 95% in the 25–34 age group, 93% in the 35–44 age group, 89% in the 45–54 age group, and 81% among those over 55.

See also 
LGBT rights in Iceland
Recognition of same-sex unions in Europe

Notes

References

External links 

LGBT rights in Iceland
Iceland
2010 in LGBT history